The southern river otter (Lontra provocax) is a species of otter that lives in Chile and Argentina. Although called a "river otter", it inhabits both marine and freshwater environments. It sometimes is considered a subspecies of Lontra canadensis. The southern river otter is listed as endangered, due to illegal hunting, water pollution, and habitat loss.

Description
This medium-sized otter's body can grow up to 2.5 ft (70 cm) long, with a tail adding about 16 in (40 cm). Body weight averages about 5–10 kg (11-22 lbs). Its fur is dark-brown on the top and has a lighter cinnamon color on its underside.

Behavior
Although the female and her young will live in family groups, males are usually solitary. Litter sizes average one to two pups, but up to four can be born at a time. Their diets include fish, crustaceans, mollusks, and birds.

Habitat
The southern river otter can be found in marine, freshwater, and terrestrial habitats, but are mostly found in freshwater lakes and rivers having a significant amount of dense vegetation, especially along the shorelines, which must be present to use as cover. Their habitats also need the root systems of mature trees, as well as fallen tree debris.

Threats
Southern river otters were vigorously hunted for their pelts throughout the last 100 years. This is the major cause of their current low population numbers and endangered conservation status. Since then, they have not been able to recover due to a number of other threats. At this point, only seven known populations of this species are found throughout Chile and Argentina, and all of the populations are isolated from each other.

The riparian forests and rivers in which these otters are mostly found have been disturbed by human presence. Dam and road construction, as well as stream canalization and drainage for agriculture destroy many acres of what could be habitat for this species. Though Argentina began passing legislation in 1960 to outlaw the hunting of the southern river otter, hunting still does occur because of the lack of enforcement. Hunting is legal and does occur in Chile.

The continual decrease in prey numbers also causes problems for the southern river otter. Some invasive aquatic species that have been introduced into that area are limiting the mollusks and fish available for otter prey. This causes the otters to move to other freshwater systems to hunt for food.

Conservation
Several surveys and studies have been performed on the southern river otter to better understand its declining population numbers to be able to prevent the species from becoming extinct. Several of the known populations are found within national forests. In Argentina the hunting and capture of the southern river otter is forbidden since 1950.

One survey in particular was performed to determine if any of this species live within these protected areas. The author surveyed three parks in Argentina: Lanin, Puelo, and Los Alerces National Parks. The surveyors spoke with people who live and work near these areas, and looked for prints and droppings of the southern river otter, while also looking for signs of the American mink. The mink was introduced into this area and is thought to compete with the southern river otter for food resources and habitat space. The results showed signs of the southern river otter were found in 32 of the 275 surveyed sites within the three parks. Of the 32 confirmed sites, 31 were of dense forest with thick undergrowth near the shorelines of freshwater systems. These results suggest having shoreline vegetation for cover is vital for their survival.

In 2022 the otter was reported for the first time in Fonck Lake since enquiries in the lake begun in the 1980s.

Future directions
Future directions for conserving this species include obtaining better information on the southern river otter's population numbers and locations. If conservationists know where the individuals and families live, enforcement of antipoaching laws, as well as focusing on maintaining and protecting their habitats, will be easier. Captive breeding programs would also be beneficial for this species, to later reintroduce individuals into the areas where they were previously found in.

In culture
In Mapuche culture the southern river otter, or huillín, is associated with sexual prowess. Its fat is said to help loncos to satisfy their multiple wives.

References

External links

 Animal Diversity Web

Lontra
Mammals of Patagonia
Mammals of Argentina
Mammals of Chile
Carnivorans of South America
Endangered fauna of South America
Mammals described in 1908
Taxa named by Oldfield Thomas
Species endangered by habitat loss